This is a list of episodes from All Dogs Go to Heaven: The Series.

Series overview

Episodes

Season 1 (1996–97)

Season 2 (1997–98)

Season 3 (1998)

See also 
 An All Dogs Christmas Carol, the third and final film of the franchise that was consequently the series finale

References 

List
All Dogs Go To Heaven